Eight Feet in the Andes is a book by Irish author Dervla Murphy. It was first published by John Murray in 1983.

Summary
Eight Feet in the Andes describes Murphy's time in Peru with her daughter Rachel. The trip was a turning point. Until then, she had enjoyed the liberation and excitement of travel, but the miseries endured by Indigenous people brought home to her how tough conditions were in places like Lima, with its rampant cholera and tuberculosis.

References

External links
 

1983 non-fiction books
John Murray (publishing house) books
Books by Dervla Murphy
Books about Peru